The ARIA Singles Chart ranks the best-performing singles in Australia. Its data, published by the Australian Recording Industry Association, is based collectively on each single's weekly physical and digital sales. In 2014, fourteen singles claimed the top spot. Eight acts achieved their first number-one single in Australia: A Great Big World, 5 Seconds of Summer, Sheppard, Ed Sheeran, The Madden Brothers, Paloma Faith, Meghan Trainor and Mark Ronson. 5 Seconds of Summer, Sheppard, Justice Crew and The Veronicas were the only Australian artists that achieved a number-one single in 2014.

Sheeran had two number-one singles during the year for "Sing" and "Thinking Out Loud". Taylor Swift also earned two number-one singles during the year for "Shake It Off" and "Blank Space". Pharrell Williams' "Happy" was the longest-running number-one single of 2014, having topped the ARIA Singles Chart for twelve weeks. Justice Crew's "Que Sera" was the second longest-running number-one single, with nine consecutive weeks at the top spot. Sheeran's "Thinking Out Loud" stayed at number one for five consecutive weeks, while Trainor's "All About That Bass" topped the chart for four weeks. Sheppard's "Geronimo", Swift's "Shake It Off" and "Blank Space", The Veronicas' "You Ruin Me" and Ronson's "Uptown Funk" each spent three consecutive weeks at the number one spot.

Chart history

Number-one artists

See also
2014 in music
List of number-one dance singles of 2014 (Australia)
List of number-one albums of 2014 (Australia)
List of top 25 singles for 2014 in Australia
List of top 10 singles in 2014 (Australia)

References

Australia Singles
Number-one singles
2014